The United Nations Trusteeship Council is one of the six principal organs of the United Nations, established to help ensure that trust territories were administered in the best interests of their inhabitants and of international peace and security. The trust territories—most of them former mandates of the League of Nations or territories taken from nations defeated at the end of World War II—have all now attained self-government or independence, either as separate nations or by joining neighbouring independent countries. The last was Palau, formerly part of the Trust Territory of the Pacific Islands, which became a member state of the United Nations in December 1994.

History 

Provisions to form a  new UN agency to oversee the decolonization of dependent territories from colonial times were made at the San Francisco Conference in 1945 and were specified Chapter 12 of the Charter of the United Nations. Those dependent territories (colonies and mandated territories) were to be placed under the international trusteeship system created by the United Nations Charter as a successor to the League of Nations mandate system. Ultimately, eleven territories were placed under trusteeship: seven in Africa and four in Oceania. Ten of the trust territories had previously been League of Nations mandates; the eleventh was Italian Somaliland.

In order to implement the provisions on the trusteeship system, the General Assembly passed resolution 64 on Dec. 14, 1946, which provided for the establishing of the United Nations Trusteeship Council. The Trusteeship Council held its first session in March 1947.

In March 1948, the United States proposed that the territory of Mandatory Palestine be placed under UN Trusteeship with the termination of the British Mandate in May 1948 (see American trusteeship proposal for Palestine). However, the US did not make an effort to implement this proposal, which became moot with the declaration of the State of Israel.

Under the Charter, the Trusteeship Council was to consist of an equal number of United Nations Member States administering trust territories and non-administering states. Thus, the Council was to consist of (1) all U.N. members administering trust territories, (2) the five permanent members of the Security Council, and (3) as many other non-administering members as needed to equalize the number of administering and non-administering members, elected by the United Nations General Assembly for renewable three-year terms. Over time, as trust territories attained independence, the size and workload of the Trusteeship Council was reduced. Ultimately, the Trusteeship Council came to include only the five permanent Security Council members (China, France, the Soviet Union/Russian Federation, the United Kingdom, and the United States), as the only country administering a Trust Territory (the United States) was a permanent member.

With the independence of Palau, formerly part of the Trust Territory of the Pacific Islands, in 1994, there presently are no trust territories, leaving the Trusteeship Council without responsibilities. (Since the Northern Mariana Islands was a part of the Trust Territory of the Pacific Islands and became a commonwealth of the USA in 1986, it is technically the only area not to have joined as a part of another state or gained full independence as a sovereign nation.)

The Trusteeship Council was not assigned responsibility for colonial territories outside the trusteeship system, although the Charter did establish the principle that member states were to administer such territories in conformity with the best interests of their inhabitants.

Present status
Its mission fulfilled, the Trusteeship Council suspended its operation on 1 November 1994, and although under the United Nations Charter it continues to exist on paper, its future role and even existence remains uncertain. The Trusteeship Council is currently headed by Anne Gueguen, with Jonathan Guy Allen as vice-president, although the sole current duty of these officers is to meet with the heads of other UN agencies on occasion. According to the United Nations website:
By a resolution adopted on 25th of May 1994, the Council amended its rules of procedure to drop the obligation to meet annually and agreed to meet as occasion required -- by its decision or the decision of its President, or at the request of a majority of its members or the General Assembly or the Security Council.
The chamber itself is still used for other purposes. Following a three-year refurbishment, restoring its original design by Danish architect, Finn Juhl, the chamber was re-opened in 2013.

Future prospects
The formal elimination of the Trusteeship Council would require the revision of the UN Charter, which is why it has not been pursued. Other functions for the Trusteeship Council have been considered.

The Commission on Global Governance's 1995 report recommends an expansion of the trusteeship council. Their theory is that an international regulatory body is needed to protect environmental integrity and the global commons on the two-thirds of the world's surface that is outside national jurisdictions.

However, in March 2005, UN Secretary-General Kofi Annan proposed a sweeping reform of the United Nations, including an expansion of the Security Council. As this restructuring would involve significant changes to the UN charter, Annan proposed the complete elimination of the Trusteeship Council as part of these reforms.

Gallery

See also
 United Nations list of non-self-governing territories
 American trusteeship proposal for Palestine

References

External links

 Homepage of the UN Trusteeship Council
 UN Decolonization page
The UN Digital Library of Trusteeship Council documents

 
United Nations organs